The Hotel Oloffson is an inn in central Port-au-Prince, Haiti.  Built in the late 19th century as a private home, it was turned into a hotel in 1935, and became known for the many artists and celebrities who stayed there. The hotel was the real-life inspiration for the fictional Hotel Trianon in Graham Greene's 1966 novel The Comedians.

History

The hotel was constructed in the late 19th century as a private home for the Sam family. Its main structure is a Gothic gingerbread mansion set in a lush tropical garden.

The head of a prestigious and influential family in Port-au-Prince, Tirésias Simon Sam was president of Haiti from 1896 to 1902. The mansion was built by Tirésias's son, Demosthenes Simon Sam. The Sams lived in the mansion until 1915, when their cousin Vilbrun Guillaume Sam was selected from among a group of powerful politicians to assume the post of president, the fifth president in five years. Guillaume would be president for a scant five months. Sam had acted harshly against his political opponents, particularly the better educated and wealthier mulatto population. The epitome of his repressive measures came on July 27, 1915, when he ordered the execution of 167 political prisoners, including former president Oreste Zamor, who was being held in a Port-au-Prince jail. This infuriated the population, which rose up against Sam's government as soon as news of the executions reached them. Sam fled to the French embassy, where he received asylum before being torn to pieces by an angry mob. United States President Woodrow Wilson, concerned that the Haitian government might be seized by Rosalvo Bobo, who was thought to be sympathetic to the Germans, ordered the United States Marine Corps to seize Port-au-Prince. The occupation would eventually extend to the entire nation of Haiti. The Sam mansion was used as a US military hospital for the duration of the occupation.

In 1935, when the occupation ended, the mansion was leased to Werner Gustav Oloffson, a Swedish sea captain from Germany, who converted the property into a hotel with his wife Margot and two sons Olaf and Egon. In the 1950s, Roger Coster, a French photographer, assumed the lease on the hotel and ran it with his Haitian wife, Laura. The hotel came to be known as the "Greenwich Village of the Tropics", attracting actors, writers, and artists. Some of the suites in the hotel were named after the artists and writers who frequented the hotel, including Graham Greene, James Jones, Charles Addams, and Sir John Gielgud.

A New York native, Al Seitz, acquired the hotel lease in 1960. During the 1970s and early 1980s, the hotel enjoyed a brief period of fame and good fortune. Celebrities such as Jacqueline Kennedy Onassis and Mick Jagger were regular guests, and like Coster before him, Seitz named favorite rooms at the hotel after the celebrity guests. After Al Seitz died in 1982, his widow, the former Suzanne Laury, continued to operate it. As the grip of Duvalierism closed over the country, however, the foreign tourist trade dried up. The hotel survived by serving as the desired residence for foreign reporters and foreign aid workers who needed secure lodging in the center of town.

In 1987, with the help of his half-brother Jean Max Sam, Richard A. Morse signed a 15-year lease to manage the Hotel Oloffson, then in near-ruins after the final years of Duvalierism. In restoring the hotel business, Morse hired a local folkloric dance troupe and slowly converted it into a mizik rasin band. Richard Morse would become the songwriter and lead male vocalist and the name of the band, RAM, comes from his initials. The band became famous for their protest music during the Raoul Cédras military dictatorship from 1991 to 1994.  Throughout the political upheaval of Haiti in the 1990s, RAM's regular Thursday evening performance at the hotel became one of the few regular social events in Port-au-Prince in which individuals of various political positions and allegiances could congregate. Regular attendees of the performances included foreign guests at the hotel, members of the military, paramilitary attachés and former Tonton Macoutes, members of the press, diplomats, foreign aid workers, artists, and businessmen. Attendees included both black Haitians and members of the nation's less populous racial groups.

During the January 12, 2010, earthquake, the Hotel Oloffson was damaged. US photographer Tequila Minsky who was also staying in the Oloffson, told the New York Times that a wall at the front of the Hotel Oloffson had fallen, killing a passer-by, and that several neighboring buildings had collapsed. Richard Morse, using the social networking site Twitter, was a major source of news coming out of the disaster area in the early hours. In a Twitter post from January 12, he states "Our guests are sitting out in the driveway.. no serious damage here at the Oloffson but many large buildings nearby have collapsed." The hotel was one of Port-au-Prince's only hotels left standing and the worldwide media subsequently decamped to the hotel and its grounds. 

The hotel is open, continues to operate, and RAM continues to play their regular Thursday night show.

Popular culture

The Hotel Oloffson was the inspiration for the fictional Hotel Trianon in Graham Greene's 1966 novel about Duvalierist Haiti, The Comedians.
The New Yorker cartoonist Charles Addams, reportedly modeled his trademark haunted houses cartoons on "the Oloffson’s tropo-Gothic gingerbread façade."
The Hotel Oloffson is featured in Max Hardberger's auto-biography SEIZED! A Sea Captain's Adventures Battling Scoundrels and Pirates While Recovering Stolen Ships in the World's Most Troubled Waters.
In 2011, the Hotel Oloffson was featured prominently in an episode of Anthony Bourdain's travel television show Anthony Bourdain: No Reservations.
The Hotel Oloffson appears in the Kurt Vonnegut novel Deadeye Dick.
 The hotel appears throughout Bob Shacochis's novel The Woman Who Lost Her Soul.

References
Cited References

General References

Shacochis, Bob (1999). The Immaculate Invasion. New York, New York: Penguin Publishing. .
Michael Deibert. Notes from the Last Testament: The Struggle for Haiti. Seven Stories Press, New York, 2005. .

External links

Hotel Oloffson Official Site
Photos of the Hotel Oloffson by Karl Grobl
"Voodoo Art at the Hotel Oloffson"
"Hope and Lodging in Port-au-Prince: The Oloffson is a magnet for intellectuals, writers and the criminally inclined. Lisa Wixon reveals why it offers hope for Haiti's future."
"La dérive douce d'un enfant de Petit Goâve", documentary film about Haitian writer Dany Laferrère was partially filmed at the hotel.
FaceBook Fan Page / Hotel Oloffson

Hotels in Haiti
Hotel Oloffson
Hotel Oloffson
Hotels established in 1935
Hotel Oloffson
19th-century architecture